New Mexico chile or New Mexican chile (Scientific name: Capsicum annuum 'New Mexico Group';) is a cultivar group of the chile pepper from the US state of New Mexico, first grown by Pueblo and Hispano communities throughout Santa Fe de Nuevo México. These landrace chile plants were used to develop the modern New Mexico chile peppers by horticulturist Dr. Fabián García and his students, including Dr. Roy Nakayama, at what is now New Mexico State University in 1894.

New Mexico chile, which typically grows from a green to a ripened red, is popular in the cuisines of the Southwestern United States, including Sonoran and Arizonan cuisine, and an integral staple of New Mexican cuisine. It is also sometimes featured in the broader Mexican cuisine. Chile is one of New Mexico's state vegetables, and is referenced in the New Mexico state question "Red or Green?".

The flavor of New Mexico green chiles has been described as lightly pungent, similar to an onion, or like garlic with a subtly sweet, spicy, crisp, and smoky taste. The ripened red chiles retain this flavor, but add an earthiness and bite, while aging mellows the front-heat and delivers more of a back-heat. The spiciness depends on the variety.

History
Many types of chile plants were first grown by Pueblo residents, who continue to grow their own strains; each with a distinct pungency, sweetness, taste, and heat. For example, the Zia Pueblo chile has a bitter-sweet flavor when it matures into its red color. When the Spanish arrived, they introduced European cultivation techniques to the chile plants, and eventually created cultivars in their towns.

The New Mexican type cultivars were developed by pioneer horticulturist Dr. Fabián García, and it is sold worldwide in places including Europe, Australia, and Japan. whose major release was the 'New Mexico No. 9' in 1913. Earlier work was done by Emelio Ortega (see section "Anaheim Pepper" below). These cultivars are "hotter" than others to suit the tastes of New Mexicans in their traditional foods. Selective breeding began with 14 lineages of 'Pasilla', 'Colorado', and 'Negro' cultivars, from throughout New Mexico and Southern Colorado. These first commercially viable peppers were created to have a "larger, smoother, fleshier, more tapering and shoulderless pod for canning purposes."

Internationally renowned expert on chile genetics, breeding, and germplasm evaluation, Paul Bosland, founded the Chile Pepper Institute at New Mexico State University to study New Mexico's iconic state vegetable and peppers from around the world.

Cultivation
Fruits of New Mexico chile plants are grown from seeds – and each of the individual strains is specifically bred and grown to be disease-resistant and provide consistent and healthy plants within their specific regions. Altitude, climate, soil, and acreage affects a crop's taste and heartiness, making the New Mexican region unique for plant propagation. The Rio Grande bosque, mountains, and high deserts provide the appropriate regional environment for growing chile. To ensure that a variety's lineage remains disease-resistant and maintains optimal growth within its heritage region, seeds from specific plants are carefully selected. An example of a New Mexican chile grown outside the state is the 'Anaheim' pepper which is extremely resilient in multiple altitudes. A quirky aspect of the New Mexico chile plants regards reintroducing seeds from their heritage soil, since each successive generation becomes susceptible to disease and loss of flavor. Therefore, chile farmers usually order seeds from their heritage soils, every few generations, to reinvigorate their crop. This allows New Mexico chile growers to perpetuate successful productions.

Grown in New Mexico

New Mexico chile plants grown in New Mexico are the most sought after, since their flavor, texture, and hardiness are heavily dependent on their growing environment. The plants were originally grown by the Pueblo, and each of their distinct Pueblo plants grows best in its heritage soil. This same trend has continued with other New Mexico chile varietals grown by Spanish, Mexican, and American settlers. Among New Mexico-grown chile, the ones with the most accolades are grown along the Rio Grande, especially along the Hatch Valley. Multiple other locations in the Rio Grande Valley, outside of the Hatch Valley, also grow award-winning chile in their own right.

Hatch chile 

Hatch chile refers to varieties of species of the genus Capsicum which are grown in the Hatch Valley, an area stretching north and south along the Rio Grande from Arrey, New Mexico, in the north to Tonuco Mountain to the southeast of Hatch, New Mexico. The soil and growing conditions in the Hatch Valley create a unique terroir which contributes to the flavor of chile grown there. Most of the varieties of chile cultivated in the Hatch Valley have been developed at New Mexico State University over the last 130 years.

Hatch chiles can be purchased locally in many parts of the Southwest. Some distributors use the "Hatch" name, but do not actually grow and process their chile in the Hatch Valley. To protect Hatch and other New Mexican growers, state legislators passed a 2012 law prohibiting the sale in New Mexico of chile described as "New Mexican" unless grown in New Mexico or came with a prominent "Not grown in New Mexico" disclaimer. Chile grown around the town are marketed under the name of the town, and are often sold fresh-roasted in New Mexico and nationwide in late summer and early autumn.

Pueblo chile 
Pueblo chile plants have been cultivated by the Puebloan peoples of New Mexico for centuries. The Acoma Pueblo chile is mild, with a lightly flavorful pungency. The Isleta Pueblo chile develops a fruity sweet flavor as it grows into its red chile state. The Zia Pueblo chile develops a bitter-sweet flavor when it matures into its red color, and its heat is similar to the 'Heritage 6-4'.

Outside of New Mexico

California 

The Anaheim pepper is a mild variety of the cultivar 'New Mexico No. 9' and commonly grown outside of New Mexico. It is related to the 'New Mexico No. 6 and 9', but when grown out of state they have a higher variability rate. The name 'Anaheim' derives from Emilio Ortega, a farmer who brought the seeds from New Mexico to the Anaheim, California, area in 1894. The chile "heat" of 'Anaheim' chiles varies from 500 to 2,500 on the Scoville scale.

Colorado
In Colorado, 'Numex Mirasol' chile peppers are grown near the city of Pueblo, where they are known as "Pueblo chile". These should not be confused with the ancient chile varieties grown by Puebloans.

Outer space
On July 12, 2021, NASA astronauts aboard the International Space Station started growing New Mexico chile from seeds packaged in soil on Earth, in the Advanced Plant Habitat (APH). 'Numex Española Improved' was chosen from more than two dozen varieties for its performance in testing environments. The peppers were grown aboard the spacecraft utilizing specially formulated fertilizers, with the fruit later evaluated for flavor, texture, and piquancy. These were the first Capsicum plants grown off of Earth.

In October, after tending and pollinating the plants for three months, the astronauts harvested the chile and prepared "space tacos".

Uses

Food

Green chile is served roasted and peeled, whole or diced, as a powder, and in various sauces. The most common uses are often served diced, or in sauces and is elemental to dishes such as enchiladas, burritos, burgers, french fries, or rice. Chile is also served whole raw, fried, or baked . New Mexican-style  follow the much more traditional Mexican technique of being covered with egg batter and fried, although variations and casseroles do exist.

In addition to local restaurants, most national food chains such as Applebee's, Domino's Pizza, McDonald's, and Jack in the Box operating in the state offer green chile on many of their menu items, and display a "New Mexico Certified Chile" placard or window sticker.

The red chile (the matured green chile) is frequently dried and ground to a powder. These dried or powdered fruits are turned into a red chile sauce. The dried peppers are rehydrated by boiling in a pot, and then blended with various herbs and spices, such as onion, garlic, and occasionally Mexican oregano. Red chile powder is usually simply blended with water, herbs, and spices; the addition of flour or other thickening agents is often considered to be non-traditional or non-purist.

Serving both red and green chile on a dish is sometimes referred to as "Christmas" style. Both green and red chile can be dried and turned into a powder, though this is more common with red chile.

Art 
Chiles are used in the state to construct both decorative and functional ristras (arrangements of drying pepper pods) and chile wreaths. Some varieties have colorful fruit and are used as ornamental plants.

Industry 
Some chile varieties such as 'NuMex Garnet' are used as a pigment stock to produce red dye.

Economy 

Ongoing drought, unpredictable weather, and environmental concerns have strained New Mexico's production of chile peppers, the state's primary agricultural produce.

In 2019 average chile sales price was $793 per ton, and accounted for $50M in sales within New Mexico.

Harvest 
Chile is planted in New Mexico in March and April, and harvested between July and October for green chile, and between October and December for red chile.

Harvest is done by both local farmhands and hired help, and also by Mexican farmhands who seasonally work in the Mesilla Valley harvesting the chile, then travel back into Mexico. Because the plants are delicate and produce fruits continuously until the frost, and because the pods are very easily damaged, machine harvesting of chile is especially difficult. Currently, much development, breeding, and engineering is being done to produce a successful chile harvester and machine-harvestable breeds. This puts a limit on the amount of chile that can be economically harvested in New Mexico even if water was unlimited.

Of  of chile crops planted in 2019, 8,700 were harvested;  were harvested as "all red". In 2019, New Mexico led the nation in chile production with  harvested.

New Mexico Certified Chile 
A certification program was started in 2014, New Mexico Certified Chile, which certifies the growing and sale of New Mexican chile. The program protects New Mexico chile consumers from falsely labeled products, while protecting farmers from potential diminished demand, which allows larger amounts of New Mexico chile to be grown within the state. When the program was first introduced, it had garnered some criticism, especially in regard to restrictions on farmers who have been growing chile plants from seed lineages more than 400 years old.

Cultural impact
New Mexico chile has had a significant impact on New Mexico's cuisine, art, cultures, and even its legislature. Just as with the Zia sun symbol, the chile pepper and its shape, the red and green coloration, and even the silhouette of the fruit, has become a symbol of New Mexican cultural identity, and is featured prominently in both food and nonfood corporate logos, in public artworks, media, infrastructure (i.e. bridges, light poles, etc.) and traditions around the state.

New Mexico is the only state with an official State Question: "Red or green?" and a State Answer: "Red and green or Christmas." "Red or green?" refers to the choices of chile sauce typically offered at local restaurants and is usually asked as quoted. To answer "Christmas" is to choose both red and green on the same dish, an option originally suggested by waitress Martha Rotuno at Tia Sophia's restaurant in Santa Fe.  Chile is also one of the official state vegetables of New Mexico. One of the official license plate designs in New Mexico, the Chile Plate, features red and green chile, and the tagline "Chile Capital of the World" in yellow type.

The lamp posts on Elephant Butte Dam's crest road were lit red and green, a reference to the dam and its reservoir being the source of irrigation and electricity for the chile-growing Hatch region. The New Mexico Department of Game and Fish's "Special Trout Waters" fishing water designations are listed as "Red Chile Waters", "Green Chile Waters", or "Xmas Chile Waters", depending on the restrictions in place at the trout fishing location.

The village of Hatch, New Mexico, in the Hatch Valley is the center of chile farming in the southwest, and bills itself as the "Chile Capital of the World". The village has hosted an annual "Chile Festival" every summer since 1971.

A ristra is an arrangement of drying chile pods. It is a popular decorative design in the state of New Mexico, and in media nationwide as symbol of New Mexican culture. Some households still use ristras as a means to dry and procure red chile.

"Chile" versus "chili"
In modern everyday English in most of the world, "chile", "chili" and "chilli" all refer to the fruit of C. annuum; in Spanish, "chile" (chee-le), from Nahuatl chīlli, is used for the pepper. In New Mexican English, however, "chile" (chill-ee) refers to the fruit, while "chili" refers only to chili con carne. 'Green chile chili' is chili con carne made with green chile. The word "chile", as used in "green chile", "red chile", or by itself, is also used in layterms to refer specifically to the New Mexico variety, while other varieties are referred to as "peppers" (i.e. jalapeño pepper, ghost pepper).

Many organizations, including farmers, breeders, consumers, and even the New Mexico Department of Tourism make efforts to educate the general public about the differences in spelling within the state, as using "chili" while referring to New Mexican chile may be taken as an insult to some locals.

None of these spellings should be confused with the nation of Chile (pronounced: CHEE-lay), which has a separate, unrelated etymology. (See: Etymology of Chile)

Roasting season

The first crop of chile of the year usually arrives at retail in New Mexico and surrounding areas by August, which signals the start of "roasting season". Retail establishments around the state, including national chains such as Albertsons and Walmart, set up specially designed apparatuses called 'chile roasters' outside, and display signage advertising the availability of the fruit. A chile roaster consists of a drum with the long side of heavy gauge steel diamond mesh and the ends of thick plate steel discs, mounted horizontally on a frame over powerful propane burners. A shaft usually runs through the center of the drum to act as an axle, a design pioneered by Emilio Ortega while in California.

A customer's chile purchase (usually a standard-size produce box-full) is loaded into the cylinder by the retailer, who usually assumes a role also called a "chile roaster", via a hatch in the mesh side. The drum is then turned, either by motor or hand crank, and the chile tumbles within over the flames, ensuring the chile pods are heated on every side as they shed their skins; this ensures the chile skins blister appropriately to allow for easier peeling of the chile. Skins, seeds, and other debris falls through the bottom of the drum. This process is the most popular method since it offers a physical display of the chile; it offers the sound of the chiles crackling, and the sight of the blistering and falling skins, accompanied by the widely distributed smell of the roasting peppers which has become a staple during the early New Mexican autumn. The skins of the roasted chiles are inedible, and peeling the chiles to prepare them for freezer storage is a traditional family communal activity. Some people eat the fresh roasted chiles as a snack, but the Chile Pepper Institute recommends cooking them to  before consuming to reduce the risk of foodborne pathogens.

Horno-roasting chile, while done less often, is a more traditional method. A more common method is simply roasting over an open flame on gas stove-tops and grills.

Cultivars and landraces
Though most New Mexico type peppers are long pod-type peppers, that ripen from green to red, the multitude of New Mexico type cultivars have a slight variance in taste, and widely varying appearances and heat levels. Some varieties may turn yellow, orange, or brown.

The most common New Mexico chile plants are the 'New Mexico 6-4', 'Big Jim', 'Sandia', 'No. 6', and 'No. 9' cultivars. The improved 'Heritage 6-4', 'Heritage Big Jim', and 'Sandia Select' cultivars provide a better yield and uniformity. Peppers like the 'Chimayó', 'Velarde', 'Jemez', 'Escondida', 'Alcalde', 'San Felipe', 'Española', and several others, represent what is known as New Mexico's unique landrace chile, which provide their own unique tastes and usually command a higher price.

In popular culture
According to Taos academic and writer Larry Torres, green chile is referenced in an old New Mexico poem: "Roses are red. Chile is green. Our love will never vanish, just like tortillas and beans."

References

External links
 The Chile Pepper Institute, New Mexico State University

Capsicum cultivars
Chili peppers
Crops originating from North America
Fruit vegetables
Mexican cuisine
Chile
Spices